No-pan kissa (literally "no-panties cafe") is a Japanese term for maid cafés where the waitresses wear short skirts with no underwear. The floors, or sections of the floor, were sometimes mirrored.

Shops generally operate under a "no-touch" policy. The shops otherwise look like normal coffee shops, rather than sex establishments, although they charge a premium price for the coffee. Previously, most sex establishments had been establishments, such as soaplands and pink salons, with professional prostitutes. No-pan kissa were a popular employment choice amongst some women because they paid well and generally required little sexual contact with the customers.

The first one to open was in Osaka in 1980. Initially, all of them were in remote areas outside the traditional entertainment districts. Within a year, large numbers had opened in many more places, such as major railway stations.

In the 1980s (the peak of the boom in these shops), many started to have topless or bottomless waitresses. However, at this point, the number of such shops started to decline rapidly.

Eventually, such coffee shops gave way to fashion health (massage) clubs and few no-pan kissa, if any, remain. The New Amusement Business Control and Improvement Act came into force on February 13, 1985, which further restricted the sex industry and protected the more traditional businesses.

In addition to no-pan kissa, there have also been no-pan shabu-shabu and no-pan karaoke.

See also
 Sexuality in Japan

References

 Akira Suei, "The Lucky Hole as the Black Hole" in Nobuyoshi Araki, Tokyo Lucky Hole, .

Types of coffeehouses and cafés
Cosplay
Sex industry in Japan
Nudity
1980s in Japan
Coffeehouses and cafés in Japan

ja:風俗店の歴史#ノーパン喫茶